Willington is a village in Warwickshire, England. Population details are included within Barcheston. The origin of the place-name is from Old English tun (homestead or farm) of Wulfāf's (or Wīglāf's) people. It appears as Ullavintone in the Domesday Book, and as Wullavington in 1287.

References

External links

Villages in Warwickshire